Plecoptera inquinata is a species of moth of the family Noctuidae first described by Julius Lederer in 1857. It is found in Turkey, Azerbaijan, Iran, Lebanon and Israel.

Adults are on wing from May to October. There are two generations per year.

External links

Image

Catocalinae
Insects of Turkey
Moths of the Middle East